Thomas Benedict Clarke (1848–1931) was an art collector from New York City.

Biography
He was born in New York City as the son of Dr. George Washington Clarke (1816–1908), headmaster of the Mount Washington Collegiate Institute of New York. He finished his education at his father's institution and started off as a businessman in linen and lace manufacturing, but also became a patron of American contemporary art. He married Fannie Eugenia Morris in 1871 and became a patron of leading artists of the Hudson River School in the 1870s, including George Inness and Albert Bierstadt. In 1883, his collection was shown as one of the first exhibitions at the American Art Association.

He also began collecting porcelain, and donated some to Union League Club of New York while he was chairman of the art committee there. He retired from the linen business in 1888 to become a full-time art dealer and was an art advisor and agent for J. P. Morgan.

He bought the premises of the Suffolk Hunt Club in East Hampton, Long Island in 1917 as a summer home, while transforming his new residence in New York into an art gallery, today the home of the Collectors Club of New York. His daughter Grace, who married the equestrian painter Richard Newton Jr., had been a member there until her death in 1915, and Clarke published her books with illustrations by her husband in 1917. He renamed his Long Island residence "Lindenland".

References

External links
Auction catalog of early English and American furniture once owned by Thomas B. Clarke from The Metropolitan Museum of Art Libraries (fully available online as PDF)
Raqqa revisited: ceramics of Ayyubid Syria, a catalog from The Metropolitan Museum of Art Libraries (fully available online as PDF), which contains material from Thomas B. Clarke's collection
The private collection of Thomas B. Clarke of New York : exhibited at American Art Gallery, New York, Dec. 28, 1883 to Jan. 12, 1884 (1883), Catalog produced in 1883 for his art show "Exhibited for the benefit of a permanent fund for a prize to be given annually hereafter for the best American figure composition shown at the National Academy of Design." on Archive.org, courtesy of Smithsonian Institution Libraries
Thomas B. Clarke on Archives of American Art
Exhibition and Sales Catalogues of the Collections Thomas B. Clarke - Internet Archive - online

1848 births
1931 deaths
American art collectors
Businesspeople from New York City
The Lambs presidents